Jawahar Municipal Stadium is a stadium  in Kannur, India. It is mainly  used  for football matches. It has a capacity of 30,000 people for football matches.
 
In 2012, Diego Maradona made appearance at stadium with some magical moves with the ball.

References

External links
 Stadium picture

Football venues in Kerala
Sports venues in Kerala
Year of establishment missing